Rigsdagen was the name of the national legislature of Denmark from 1849 to 1953.

Rigsdagen was Denmark's first parliament, and it was incorporated in the Constitution of 1849. It was a bicameral legislature, consisting of two houses, the Folketing and the Landsting. The distinction between the two houses was not always clear, as they had equal power. In 1953, a new constitution was approved by referendum and adopted, with the result that Rigsdagen and the Landsting were eliminated in favor of a unicameral legislature under the name of the Folketing. Rigsdagen, like today's Folketing, was located in Christiansborg Palace in the centre of Copenhagen.

Membership in Rigsdagen was limited to certain sectors of society – women were not allowed to join, and neither were about a quarter of all men over 30, mostly due to their condition as servants or welfare recipients.

The name is a cognate of the names of several legislatures in other Germanic countries, such as the Reichstag in Germany, the Riksdag in Sweden, or the Riksdag in Finland. (For a discussion of the traditional Germanic councils that gave root to bodies such as these, see the article on Ting-style councils.)

See also
Folketing
Ting
Danish politics
Government of Denmark

1849 establishments in Denmark
1953 disestablishments in Denmark
Political history of Denmark
Denmark
Thing (assembly)